Rohod is a village in Szabolcs-Szatmár-Bereg county, in the Northern Great Plain region of eastern Hungary.

Jews lived in Rohod for many years until they were murdered in the Holocaust.

Geography

References

Rohod